Arama is a town in the Basque Country of Spain.

Arama may also refer to:
 A village in the commune of Coarnele Caprei, Iași County, Romania
 Isaac ben Moses Arama (c.1420–1494), a Spanish rabbi
 Jac Arama (born 1960), French/English poker player
 Arama (fly), genus of flies

Rivers
 Aramá River, Brazil
 Arama, a tributary of the Bistrița (Siret), Romania
 Arama River (Lunca Mare), Romania